The Johnson Act of 1934 (Foreign Securities Act, ch. 112, 1934-04-13) prohibited foreign nations in debt from marketing their bond issues in the United States.  The law was enacted on April 13, 1934, and although it was impacted by the Bretton-Woods Agreement, it was not repealed and continues to have the force of law. 

1934 in law
Economic history of the United States
United States federal securities legislation
1934 in international relations
1934 in economics
1934 in the United States